The South African Railways Class 13 4-8-0TT of 1905 was a steam locomotive from the pre-Union era in Transvaal.

In 1902, towards the end of the Second Boer War, the Imperial Military Railways placed 35  tank locomotives in service, built to the specifications of the Reid Tenwheeler of the Natal Government Railways. At the end of the war, these locomotives came onto the roster of the Central South African Railways and were designated Class E. All but six of them were subsequently converted to  tank-and-tender locomotives. In 1912, when these converted locomotives came onto the South African Railways roster, they were designated Class 13.

Manufacturers

The requirement for a tank locomotive which could haul at least one-and-a-half times as much as a Dübs A 4-8-2T locomotive on the Natal Government Railways (NGR) mainline, resulted in the design of a  tank locomotive by George W. Reid, Locomotive Superintendent of the NGR at the end of the 19th century. On the NGR, the locomotive type became known as the Reid Tenwheeler, later designated the NGR Class C.

In 1902, during the Second Boer War, the Imperial Military Railways (IMR) placed orders for 35 locomotives of the NGR's Reid Tenwheeler type. To ensure rapid delivery, the order was split between Dübs and Company, who delivered the locomotives in the number range from 220 to 234, and Neilson, Reid and Company, who delivered the locomotives in the number range from 235 to 254, all in 1902.

Service

Imperial Military Railways
In comparison to the NGR version, the IMR locomotives were more ornate. In true military tradition, the domes, chimney caps and boiler bands were of polished brass. A weatherboard was affixed to the coal bunker to offer better protection to the crew while travelling bunker forward. The practice of polished brasswork was followed on all new IMR locomotives and was continued even after the railways became the Central South African Railways (CSAR) at the end of the war.

Central South African Railways
After the war, the Reid Tenwheeler locomotives were designated Class E on the CSAR. P.A. Hyde, Chief Locomotive Superintendent of the CSAR, found them to have an inadequate coal and water supply for trips of any length and decided to convert 29 of them to 4-8-0 Mastodon type tank-and-tender engines, beginning in 1904. The trailing bissel bogie, the fifth pair of coupled wheels and the coal bunker were removed, the main frame was shortened and three- or four-axle tenders from various withdrawn or obsolete locomotives were attached. This increased the coal and water capacities which resulted in a considerable increase in the operating range of the locomotive. Since it was now able to be used without a water tank attached, it could still haul the same load as before, used less oil and was no longer prone to derailment while reversing. Crews found the locomotive more comfortable to work than the tank version.

South African Railways
When the Union of South Africa was established on 31 May 1910, the three Colonial government railways (Cape Government Railways, NGR and CSAR) were united under a single administration to control and administer the railways, ports and harbours of the Union. Although the South African Railways and Harbours came into existence in 1910, the actual classification and renumbering of all the rolling stock of the three constituent railways were only implemented with effect from 1 January 1912.

In 1912, these locomotives were designated Class 13 on the South African Railways (SAR) and renumbered in the range from 1310 to 1338. The Class 13 was used for a variety of minor tasks, almost exclusively in the Witwatersrand area. They were popular with their drivers and were nicknamed Wallopers. The last of the Class was withdrawn in 1961.

Industrial
After withdrawal, several were sold to South African mines, where some were modified once again. A few of them remained in service on the mines well into the 1980s.

Works numbers
The builders, works numbers, rebuilding and renumbering of all 35 original 4-10-2T locomotives are listed in the table.

Illustration
One of these locomotives, SAR no. 1313, warrants special mention, having served in four different configurations. It started out on the IMR as a  Reid Tenwheeler type and was then converted by the CSAR, first to a 4-8-2T Mountain type and then to a  Mastodon type, before being inherited by the SAR. Finally, in mine service, its side tanks were removed to convert it to a regular  tender locomotive.

The main picture shows a Class 13 in tank-and-tender configuration, c. 1912. The following pictures show Class 13 no. 1337 with its side tanks removed to convert it to a regular  configuration while in mine service.

References

1730
1730
4-8-0 locomotives
2D locomotives
Dübs locomotives
Neilson Reid locomotives
Cape gauge railway locomotives
Railway locomotives introduced in 1905
1905 in South Africa